Julia Longorkaye is a paralympic athlete from Kenya competing mainly in category T12 middle-distance events.

Julia competed in the 400m, 800m and 1500m at the 2004 Summer Paralympics winning the silver medal in the longer distance.

References

Paralympic athletes of Kenya
Athletes (track and field) at the 2004 Summer Paralympics
Paralympic silver medalists for Kenya
Kenyan female middle-distance runners
Living people
Year of birth missing (living people)
Medalists at the 2004 Summer Paralympics
Paralympic medalists in athletics (track and field)
20th-century Kenyan women
21st-century Kenyan women